Kelly Denton (born March 10, 1973) is an American former professional stock car racing driver who competed in NASCAR between 1996 and 2002.

Racing career

Craftsman Truck Series
Denton drove a second Grier Lackey Dodge in two races in 1996. He piloted the No. 03 Mopar Dodge in his first career race at Martinsville Speedway, starting in 8th place, but finished last (36th) after mechanical woes. He also ran the next race at North Wilkesboro Speedway, starting 7th and finishing 18th.

Denton would make eight starts in 1997, driving for Lackey in the first five of those starts. Denton started 5th at Walt Disney World Speedway before finishing 23rd. Denton had his best run for Lackley with a 16th at Phoenix International Speedway in April, and then bettered that with a 12th-place finish at Bristol Motor Speedway. Denton switched over to the No. 35 Charles Hardy-owned car and completed three races for the team. His best run was an 18th at Martinsville.

Busch Series
Denton ran the majority of his early Busch Series career for Henderson Motorsports, beginning in 1998. He made his first career start by starting 18th at Bristol and coming home 33rd in the No. 75 for Henderson. Denton also made the fall race, but finished 43rd after an early engine expiration.

In 1999, Denton hoped to run for NASCAR Busch Series Rookie of the Year honors for Henderson with sponsorship from Big Daddy's BBQ Sauce. Unfortunately, the sponsorship deal was canceled, forcing Denton to make only four starts. He started the season off with a finish of 20th at Talladega Superspeedway and that ended up being his best career finish. He was also 22nd at Rockingham in addition to the two Bristol races. Denton finished 41st and 34th in those Bristol races.

Denton would make four starts in 2000, as he finished 38th in the season opening race at Daytona International Speedway. He also went on to once again compete the season races at Bristol. He recorded his best career finish in the spring, as he ended up 15th. However, he only managed 34th in the fall event. Denton also ran for Moy Racing, who hired Denton to drive their No. 77 Ford at Homestead-Miami Speedway, where he finished 30th.

Denton ran 24 of 33 races in 2001. He completed the first six races for Moy, recording a pair of 18ths at Bristol and Daytona. Denton then jumped ship and moved to the No. 54 General Creation Chevy for Team Bristol Motorsports. Denton made most of the races for that team. His finishes were solid, as he recorded a pair of 13ths at the Milwaukee Mile and Kentucky Speedway along with a finish of 16th at Dover International Speedway, but lost his ride when the team shut down at the end of the year.

Denton made only two starts in 2002. Despite finishes of 16th at Daytona and 27th at Rockingham, Denton was released in favor of Kevin Grubb after qualifying for the third race at Las Vegas. Denton has not raced in major NASCAR since.

Motorsports career results

NASCAR
(key) (Bold – Pole position awarded by qualifying time. Italics – Pole position earned by points standings or practice time. * – Most laps led.)

Busch Series

Craftsman Truck Series

Winston West Series

ARCA Bondo/Mar-Hyde Series
(key) (Bold – Pole position awarded by qualifying time. Italics – Pole position earned by points standings or practice time. * – Most laps led.)

References

External links
 

Living people
1973 births
People from Bristol, Virginia
Racing drivers from Virginia
NASCAR drivers
ARCA Menards Series drivers